Herbert Mitchell Parker (January 18, 1921 - October 7, 2007) was an educator and football coach at Minot State University.

Early life
Parker was born in Jamestown, North Dakota and raised and educated in Nekoma. Parker was an all-conference athlete and captain of the basketball team, while at Jamestown College. In 1983, Parker was inducted into the college's Athletic Hall of Fame. Parker also has been inducted into the MSU Athletic Hall of Fame and the NAIA Hall of Fame. Parker received a master's degree from the University of Northern Colorado in Greeley.

Teaching and coaching career
In 1942, Parker married Marjorie Wilson in Washburn, North Dakota and moved to Dickinson.  Parker taught and coached at Dickinson High School until 1947, when his family moved to Minot.  Parker taught physical education and coached football, basketball and track at Minot State Teacher's College (now Minot State), where he was employed until his retirement in 1983.  Parker coached future LSU coach Dale Brown at Minot State Teacher's College.  Brown earned varsity letters in basketball, football and track every year he attended school in Minot.  Parker served as Athletic Director for Minot State from 1947 until 1959 and from 1974 until 1976.  From 1959 until his retirement, Parker also served as Dean of Men.  In 1983, Minot State University, named the football stadium in his honor.

References

1921 births
2007 deaths
Basketball coaches from North Dakota
College men's basketball head coaches in the United States
Minot State Beavers athletic directors
Minot State Beavers football coaches
Minot State Beavers men's basketball coaches
People from Jamestown, North Dakota